The 1935–36 Western Kentucky State Teachers Hilltoppers men's basketball team represented Western Kentucky State Normal School and Teachers College (now known as Western Kentucky University) during the 1935-36 NCAA basketball season. The team was led by future Naismith Memorial Basketball Hall of Fame coach Edgar Diddle and leading scorer Brad Mutchler. The Hilltoppers won the Kentucky Intercollegiate Athletic Conference, led NCAA in wins for the 3rd consecutive year, and received an invitation to the National Olympic Playoff representing the South.
Mutchler, Max Reed, Elmo Meacham, and William “Red” McCrocklin were selected to the All-SIAA team. Mutchler, Reed, and Meacham were also named to the All-State team.

Schedule

|-
!colspan=6| Regular Season

|-

 

|-
!colspan=6| 1936 Kentucky Intercollegiate Athletic Conference Tournament

|-
!colspan=6| 1936 Southern Intercollegiate Athletic Association Tournament

|-
!colspan=6| National Olympic Playoff

References

Western Kentucky Hilltoppers basketball seasons
Western Kentucky State Teachers